Ghoncheh Khoran (also Romanized as Ghoncheh Khorān; also known as Ghonchehkhoran) is a village in Niyarak Rural District, Tarom Sofla District, Qazvin County, Qazvin Province, Iran. At the 2006 census, its population was 68, in 15 families.

References 

Populated places in Qazvin County